Nepenthes ramispina (from Latin ramus "branch" and spina "spine, spur") is a highland Nepenthes pitcher plant species, native to Peninsular Malaysia. It was once regarded as being similar to N. gracillima, but studies of the two species in nature have shown that they are readily distinguishable in isolation, N. gracillima being far more readily confused with N. macfarlanei in its rosette stage.

Natural hybrids

 N. macfarlanei × N. ramispina
 N. ramispina × N. sanguinea

References

Further reading

 Bauer, U., C.J. Clemente, T. Renner & W. Federle 2012. Form follows function: morphological diversification and alternative trapping strategies in carnivorous Nepenthes pitcher plants. Journal of Evolutionary Biology 25(1): 90–102. 
 Bonhomme, V., H. Pelloux-Prayer, E. Jousselin, Y. Forterre, J.-J. Labat & L. Gaume 2011. Slippery or sticky? Functional diversity in the trapping strategy of Nepenthes carnivorous plants. New Phytologist 191(2): 545–554. 
 Bourke, G. 2003.  Carniflora Australis (2): 23–26.
  Meimberg, H. 2002.  Ph.D. thesis, Ludwig Maximilian University of Munich, Munich.
 Meimberg, H. & G. Heubl 2006. Introduction of a nuclear marker for phylogenetic analysis of Nepenthaceae. Plant Biology 8(6): 831–840. 
 Meimberg, H., S. Thalhammer, A. Brachmann & G. Heubl 2006. Comparative analysis of a translocated copy of the trnK intron in carnivorous family Nepenthaceae. Molecular Phylogenetics and Evolution 39(2): 478–490. 
 Shivas, R.G. 1983.   Carnivorous Plant Newsletter 12(3): 65–67.
 Thorogood, C. 2010. The Malaysian Nepenthes: Evolutionary and Taxonomic Perspectives. Nova Science Publishers, New York.
 Nepenthes of Peninsula Malaysia by Stewart McPherson

Carnivorous plants of Asia
ramispina
Endemic flora of Peninsular Malaysia
Vulnerable flora of Asia
Plants described in 1908